Toto Pongsawang or spelt Toto Por.Pongsawang is a former Thai professional boxer and Muay Thai fighter of the 1990s.

Biography & career
Toto had a reputation for being a Muay Thai in Isan region in name "Toto Kangwalprai" (โตโต้ กังวาลไพร). Later, his manager Songphol "Ja Tu" Pongsawang led him to a regular at the Lumpinee Boxing Stadium, Bangkok under a promoter Songchai Rattanasuban. He is better known for defeating the hot-tempered fighter Pongsiri "Rambo" Por Ruamrudee in the second round with elbow strikes and beat Pairojnoi "Bloody Steel" Sor Siamchai with knockout in the final round even before that, he is almost defeated. That's why he was nicknamed "Lord of Miracle" from Muay Thai fans.

Later, Songphol had him change to a professional career.  It's intended that to fight just three times and then become a world champion like a legendary Saensak Muangsurin. He made a total of five wins. On September 19, 1993, he faced Ricardo "El Finito" López a WBC Strawweight champion holder at Capitol City Discothèque, Ratchadaphisek Road, Bangkok. As a result, he was defeated by TKO (referee stopped contest) in the 11th round with a very injured face although he can punched López's mouthguard bounce off.

Between 1993 and 1995, he continued to fight five more times, losing only once in the Philippines.  In 1996, he lost again and his final fight was in 1997, where he was defeated.

After Ratanapol Sor Vorapin lost IBF Mini flyweight title to Zolani Petelo in late 1997, Songphol announced that Toto would challenge Petelo but then it didn't happen, until Songphol quit being a promoter. He returned to Muay Thai again although won two times fight of the year, one of them was a fight with Rambaa Somdet, but unsuccessfully like old so finally retired.

Retirement
After retirement, Toto works a lot because he hasn't much money as labourer, auto mechanic, furniture maker, or assistant restaurant manager. Today, his right eye is completely  blind believed to be the result of a fight with López in 1993.

Professional boxing record

Muay Thai record

|-  style="background:#cfc;"
| ? || Win ||align=left| Rambaa Somdet || Omnoi Stadium || Thailand || KO (Left Elbow)|| 2||
|-  style="background:#cfc;"
| 1992-07-31 || Win ||align=left| Chartchainoi Chaorai-Oi  || Lumpinee Stadium || Bangkok, Thailand || KO (Punches & Low kicks) || 2 ||
|-  style="background:#cfc;"
| 1992-02-07 || Win ||align=left| Chatchai Paiseetong || Lumpinee Stadium || Bangkok, Thailand || Decision || 5 || 3:00
|-  style="background:#cfc;"
| ? || Win ||align=left| Chingchai Sakdaroon  || Lumpinee Stadium || Bangkok, Thailand || KO (Low kicks) ||  ||
|- style="background:#fbb;"
| 1991-10-25 || Loss ||align=left| Lamnamoon Sor.Sumalee || Lumpinee Stadium ||  Bangkok, Thailand  || Decision || 5 || 3:00
|-  style="background:#fbb;"
| 1991-09-21 || Loss ||align=left| Khanunphet JohnnyGym || Lumpinee Stadium || Bangkok, Thailand || KO || 2 ||
|-  style="background:#fbb;"
| 1991- || Loss ||align=left| Thongchai Tor.Silachai || Lumpinee Stadium || Bangkok, Thailand || Decision || 5 || 3:00
|-  style="background:#cfc;"
| 1991-04-30 || Win ||align=left| Thongchai Tor.Silachai || Lumpinee Stadium || Bangkok, Thailand || Decision || 5 || 3:00
|-  style="background:#c5d2ea;"
| 1991-02-23 || Draw||align=left| Samanchai Singkhiri || Lumpinee Stadium || Bangkok, Thailand || Decision || 5 || 3:00
|-  style="background:#cfc;"
| 1991- || Win ||align=left| Thongchai Tor.Silachai || Lumpinee Stadium || Bangkok, Thailand || Decision || 5 || 3:00

|-  style="background:#fbb;"
| 1990-11-09 || Loss ||align=left| Chandet Sor Prantalay || Lumpinee Stadium || Bangkok, Thailand || Decision || 5 || 3:00
|-  style="background:#cfc;"
| 1990- || Win ||align=left| Kompayak Singmanee || Lumpinee Stadium || Bangkok, Thailand || Decision || 5 || 3:00
|-  style="background:#fbb;"
| 1990-05-01 || Loss ||align=left| Mathee Jadeepitak || Lumpinee Stadium || Bangkok, Thailand || Decision || 5 || 3:00
|- style="background:#fbb;"
| 1990-03-06 ||Loss||align=left| Pairojnoi Sor Siamchai ||  Lumpinee Stadium  || Bangkok, Thailand || Decision|| 5 || 3:00
|- style="background:#fbb;"
| 1990-02-10 ||Loss||align=left| Chainoi Muangsurin ||  Lumpinee Stadium  || Bangkok, Thailand || Decision || 5 || 3:00
|- style="background:#cfc;"
| 1990-01-19 ||Win||align=left| Pairojnoi Sor Siamchai ||  Lumpinee Stadium  || Bangkok, Thailand || KO (High kick)|| 5 ||
|- style="background:#fbb;"
| 1989-12-27 || Loss ||align=left| Namkabuan Nongkeepahuyuth || Rajadamnern Stadium || Bangkok, Thailand  || Decision || 5 || 3:00
|- style="background:#cfc;"
| 1989-11-11 || Win ||align=left| Paruhatlek Sitchunthong ||    ||  Nakhon Pathom, Thailand  || Decision || 5 || 3:00
|- style="background:#cfc;"
| 1989-10-06 ||Win ||align=left| Hippy Singmanee || Lumpinee Stadium ||  Bangkok, Thailand  || Decision || 5 || 3:00
|- style="background:#fbb;"
| 1989-09-05 ||Loss||align=left| Veeraphol Sahaprom ||  Lumpinee Stadium  || Bangkok, Thailand || KO || 2 ||
|- style="background:#fbb;"
| 1989-08-08 ||Loss||align=left| Chainoi Muangsurin ||  Lumpinee Stadium  || Bangkok, Thailand || KO (Elbow) || 4 ||
|- style="background:#cfc;"
| 1989-06-30 ||Win ||align=left| Thongsabad Piyaphan || Lumpinee Stadium ||  Bangkok, Thailand  || TKO || 3 ||
|- style="background:#fbb;"
| 1989-06-06 ||Loss||align=left| Chainoi Muangsurin || Lumpinee Stadium ||  Bangkok, Thailand  || Decision || 5 || 3:00
|- style="background:#fbb;"
| 1989-05-02 || Loss ||align=left| Pongsiri Por Ruamrudee ||  Lumpinee Stadium  ||  Bangkok, Thailand  || Decision || 5 || 3:00
|- style="background:#fbb;"
| 1989-03-29 || Loss ||align=left| Paruhatlek Sitchunthong ||  Lumpinee Stadium  ||  Bangkok, Thailand  || Decision || 5 || 3:00
|- style="background:#fbb;"
| 1989-02-11 || Loss ||align=left| Pongsiri Por Ruamrudee ||   ||  Nakhon Ratchasima, Thailand  || Decision || 5 || 3:00
|- style="background:#cfc;"
| 1989-01-06 ||Win ||align=left|  Seesod Keatchidchanok  || Lumpinee Stadium ||  Bangkok, Thailand  || TKO || 3 ||

|- style="background:#cfc;"
| 1988-12-02 || Win ||align=left| Pairojnoi Sor Siamchai ||  Lumpinee Stadium ||  Bangkok, Thailand  || Decision || 5 || 3:00

|- style="background:#cfc;"
| 1988-11-25 || Win||align=left| Nuathoranee Sitchainarin ||  Lumpinee Stadium ||  Bangkok, Thailand  || KO (Punch) ||  4|| 

|- style="background:#cfc;"
| 1988-11-17 || Win ||align=left| Pannoi Chuwatana ||  Rajadamnern Stadium ||  Bangkok, Thailand  || Decision || 5 || 3:00

|- style="background:#fbb;"
| 1988-10-28 || Loss ||align=left| Phuengluang Kiatanan ||   ||  Bangkok, Thailand  || Decision || 5 || 3:00

|- style="background:#cfc;"
| 1988-09-27 || Win ||align=left| Morakot Sor.Tamarangsri|| Lumpinee Stadium  ||  Bangkok, Thailand  || KO || 3 || 

|- style="background:#cfc;"
| 1988-08-16 || Win ||align=left| Phuengluang Kiatanan ||   ||  Bangkok, Thailand  || KO || 5 || 

|- style="background:#fbb;"
| 1988-06-28 || Loss ||align=left| Pongsiri Por Ruamrudee ||  Lumpinee Stadium ||  Bangkok, Thailand  || Decision || 5 || 3:00

|- style="background:#cfc;"
| 1988-05-27 || Win ||align=left| Amnatsak Sor.Sinsawat ||  Lumpinee Stadium ||  Bangkok, Thailand  || Decision || 5 || 3:00

|- style="background:#fbb;"
| 1988-03-15 || Loss ||align=left| Seksan Sitjomthong ||  Lumpinee Stadium ||  Bangkok, Thailand  || Decision || 5 || 3:00

|- style="background:#fbb;"
| 1988-02-02 || Loss ||align=left| Pairojnoi Sor Siamchai ||  Lumpinee Stadium ||  Bangkok, Thailand  || Decision || 5 || 3:00
|- style="background:#fbb;"
| 1987-12-29 || Loss ||align=left| Pairojnoi Sor Siamchai ||  Lumpinee Stadium ||  Bangkok, Thailand  || Decision || 5 || 3:00
|- style="background:#cfc;"
| 1987-07-31 || Win ||align=left| Pongsiri Por Ruamrudee || Lumpinee Stadium  ||  Bangkok, Thailand  || KO || 2 ||
|- style="background:#fbb;"
| 1986-09-01 || Loss ||align=left| Karuhat Sor.Supawan ||  Lumpinee Stadium ||  Bangkok, Thailand  || Decision || 5 || 3:00
|-
| colspan=9 | Legend:

References

External links
 

Mini-flyweight boxers
Light-flyweight boxers
Bantamweight boxers
Toto Pongsawang
Living people
1968 births
Toto Pongsawang
Toto Pongsawang
Southpaw boxers